Arthur Perceval Purey-Cust (born Cust; 21 February 1828 – 23 December 1916) was a Church of England cleric and author who served as Dean of York from 1880 to 1916.

Biography
He was born as Arthur Perceval Cust, the younger son of the Honourable William Cust who was the younger son of Brownlow Cust, 1st Baron Brownlow. His mother was Sophia, daughter of Thomas Newnham. He was educated at Brasenose College, and later became a fellow of All Souls' College, Oxford. He was ordained deacon 1851 and priest 1852.

His early posts were: a curacy at Northchurch, Hertfordshire; incumbencies at  Cheddington and Reading; Honorary Canon of Oxford; and Rural Dean of Oxford. He married Lady Emma Bess Bligh, a daughter of Edward Bligh, 5th Earl of Darnley.

He became the Archdeacon of Buckingham in June 1875, and installed Vicar of Aylesbury in the same year. His final appointment was as Dean of York from 1880 to 1916.

For the next 36 years he meticulously catalogued York Minster's heritage and was the author of Heraldry of York Minster, 1890. He died in office in his 88th year and is commemorated by a mural monument in York Minster and by the adjacent Purey-Cust Lodge.

List of works
Works written by Purey-Cust include:
Parochial Organization (1877); 
The Heraldry of York Minster (1890); 
Picturesque Old York (1896); 
Our English Minsters (1897); 
The Crowning of Monarchs (1907)

References

External links
 

1828 births
1916 deaths
Alumni of Brasenose College, Oxford
Fellows of All Souls College, Oxford
19th-century English Anglican priests
Archdeacons of Buckingham
Deans of York
Arthur Purey